Lorelei Nicoll is a Canadian politician, who was elected to the Nova Scotia House of Assembly in the 2021 Nova Scotia general election. She represents the riding of Cole Harbour-Dartmouth as a member of the Nova Scotia Liberal Party.

Prior to her election to the legislature, Nicoll served on Halifax Regional Council.

Electoral record

References

Year of birth missing (living people)
Living people
Nova Scotia Liberal Party MLAs
Women MLAs in Nova Scotia
21st-century Canadian politicians
21st-century Canadian women politicians
People from Dartmouth, Nova Scotia
Halifax Regional Municipality councillors